Reybrouck is a Flemish surname. Notable people with the surname include:

David Van Reybrouck (born 1971), Belgian cultural historian, archaeologist, and author
Guido Reybrouck (born 1941), Belgian cyclist
Wilfried Reybrouck (born 1953), Belgian cyclist, brother of Guido

Dutch-language surnames